Charles Hogan (23 April 1926 – 25 October 1992) was an English professional footballer who played as a right winger in the Football League for Bury, Accrington Stanley, Southport and Rochdale. He also played for Lancashire Combination side Wigan Athletic, making four league appearances during the 1953–54 season. He was married and had four children: Elizabeth, John, Carmel and Simon.

References

External links
 Career statistics

1926 births
1992 deaths
Footballers from Bury, Greater Manchester
English footballers
Wigan Athletic F.C. players
Accrington Stanley F.C. (1891) players
Bury F.C. players
Rochdale A.F.C. players
Southport F.C. players
English Football League players
Association football wingers
English expatriates in the Netherlands